Naa Koshie Mills is a Ghanaian raised in the United Kingdom and living in the United States. She played a role in the "Year of Return", and is the host and executive producer of The Diaspora Dialogues, a television series about Africa and its diaspora.

She is married to Kwame Boakye, and has three sons who are Nana-Kofi Siriboe, Kwesi Boakye and Kwame Boateng.

Career 
Koshie Mills is an Executive Producer and host of The Diaspora Dialogues, and also the CEO of K3PR Marketing Agency.

References 

Living people
Ghanaian television personalities
Year of birth missing (living people)